Bayan Township (Mandarin: 巴燕乡) is a township in Huangyuan County, Xining, Qinghai, China. In 2010, Bayan Township had a total population of 9,569: 4,882 males and 4,687 females: 1,753 aged under 14, 7,134 aged between 15 and 65 and 682 aged over 65.

References 

Township-level divisions of Qinghai
Xining